Northern Islands Municipality is one of the four main political divisions of the Commonwealth of the Northern Mariana Islands. It consists of a long string of the northernmost islands of the Northern Marianas, including (from north to south) Farallon de Pajaros, the Maug Islands, Asuncion, Agrihan, Pagan, Alamagan, Guguan, Zealandia Bank, Sarigan, Anatahan, and Farallon de Medinilla. The total land area of the islands, including offshore islets and rocks, is 154.755 km² (59.75 sq mi).

Population

As of the 2010 census, the municipality is reported to be uninhabited. Pagan and Agrihan are known to have seasonal populations. Many Northern Island inhabitants have secondary residences on Saipan due to economic, educational or other needs. Some islands had also been evacuated due to volcanic activities such as in the case of Anatahan (2003) and Pagan (early 1980s).

The mayor's office and municipality administration, traditionally in the village of Shomushon on Pagan, is now "in exile" on Saipan. In 2005 there were 99 votes cast in the municipality.  For the NMI House of Representatives, Northern Islands voters are grouped with one of the Saipan districts.

Transportation and communications

Most of the Northern Islands can be reached only by boat, except for an airstrip that serves Pagan. There are no electricity or telephone systems, and residents rely on generators for electricity and radio for communications.

Economy

Agriculture and fishing are essentially the only economic activities, although on Pagan pozzolan mining became a small industry after the early-1980s volcanic eruptions.

Education
Previously Commonwealth of the Northern Mariana Islands Public School System operated an elementary school on Pagan  prior to the 1981 eruptions. In 1977 the school had 13 students. Students from Pagan attending secondary school did so on Saipan.

References

 Northern Mariana Islands and constituent municipalities, United States Census Bureau
 Pascal Horst Lehne and Christoph Gäbler: Über die Marianen. Lehne-Verlag, Wohldorf in Germany 1972.

External links
 Official site of the Northern Islands

Former German colonies
Municipalities of the Northern Mariana Islands
Government of the Northern Mariana Islands